Association football is the most popular sport in Kenya, followed by rugby.

The governing body of football in Kenya is the Football Kenya Federation.

The Kenyan Premier League is the only fully professional league in the country, while the Kenyan National Super League is a mix of professional and semi-professional clubs.

Kenyan football on television
Football is shown on television in the following channels:

 SuperSport / KBC - Kenyan Premier League, Kenyan National Super League, FKF President's Cup, Kenyan Super Cup, KPL Top 8 Cup, UEFA Champions League, UEFA Europa League, English Premier League, Italian Serie A, German Bundesliga, French Ligue 1, FIFA Club World Cup, Copa del Rey, Supercopa de España, FA Cup, EFL Cup FA Community Shield, Coupe de France, CAF Champions League, CAF Confederation Cup, FIFA World Cup, UEFA European Championship
Setanta Africa / Zuku Sports - French Ligue 1, Dutch Eredivisie, Belgian Pro League, Mexican Liga MX, Copa Libertadores, Copa Sudamericana, Major League Soccer, Africa Cup of Nations

League system

Men
There is a three-tier league system, with provincial, county and sub-county leagues below used to promote clubs to national leagues.

Women
 Kenyan Women's Premier League
 FKF Women's Division One
 Copa Del Kenya

Seasons in Kenyan football
The following articles detail the major results and events in each season since 1963, when the first organised Kenyan competition, the Premier League, was created.

Football stadiums in Kenya

A minimum capacity of 5,000 is required for this list.

See also
List of football clubs in Kenya

References